Muskowekwan 85-1 is an Indian reserve of the Muskowekwan First Nation in Saskatchewan. It is 6 kilometres north of Leross. In the 2016 Canadian Census, it recorded a population of 0 living in 0 of its 0 total private dwellings.

References

Indian reserves in Saskatchewan
Division No. 10, Saskatchewan